Hera Pheri is a 2000 Indian Hindi-language comedy film directed by Priyadarshan and written by Neeraj Vora, starring Akshay Kumar, Sunil Shetty, Paresh Rawal, Tabu, Om Puri and Gulshan Grover. The movie is an remake of 1989 Malayalam film Ramji Rao Speaking. It is the first instalment of the Hera Pheri franchise. The plot revolves around two tenants, Raju and Shyam and a landlord Baburao ganpatrao apte , in desperate need of money, chance upon a ransom call via a cross connection. They hatch a plan to claim the ransom for themselves.

The film released on 31 March 2000. It was opened with mixed reviews, some of whom applauded the performances of Kumar and Rawal particularly. Although film became moderate success grossing ₹17.8cr at the box office against the budget of ₹7.5cr. It spawned a sequel, Phir Hera Pheri, released in 2006.

Over the years, the film went on to become a cult classic.   and is regarded as one of the best Hindi comedy films ever made. The film is noted for its authenticity and depiction of economic problem of lower middle class families in India, situational comedy, dialogues, performances of the lead trio Kumar, Rawal and Shetty. It was voted as the best Bollywood comedy film of all time in an online poll conducted by The Indian Express.

Plot
The film begins with Ghanshyam alias Shyam, a guy from Gurgaon searching for a job at a bank. Few years earlier this had accidentally caught fire and his died in this incidentso according to rule he should get the job but there was also any other person which died few minutes after Shyam's father.As his daughter was the friend of manager, the manager wanted her friend to get the job.    One day, he accidentally bumps into a guy named Raju. Shyam mistakes Raju for a pickpocket and begins to chase him. However, he discovers the truth and the opposite occurs when Raju chases Shyam after mistaking him to be a pickpocket. Raju has his troubles, dealing with his daydreams and the unfriendly people he is working for. He is unable to keep a job and thus faces many problems.

Shyam then approaches a garage owned by a man named Baburao Ganpatrao Apte (fondly called as Babu Bhaiya) and manages to get a room on rent by compromising on the amount for Babu Bhaiya's alcohol. Unbeknownst to him, Raju is staying in the same house on rent, which he hasn't paid for the last two years. The trio falls into hilarious situations that usually involve Raju instigating Shyam and purposefully trying to create a ruckus that Babu Bhaiya, has to resolve. During one such fight, a girl named Anuradha Shivshankar Panikar arrives and tries to persuade Shyam to sign the Non-Objection Certificate, so that she could have the job at the bank. When Shyam refuses, Raju hatches a plot to make him sign the papers. Shyam eventually finds out that Raju deceitfully made him sign the papers and that is when the rivalry between the two commences. An old friend of Shyam, Khadak Singh, comes to his place asking to return his money which Shyam took from Khadak Singh as a loan. Khadak Singh asks Shyam to pay the loan back as soon as possible or else his sister's marriage would be cancelled.

Shyam finds out that Raju has been deceiving his mother by posing as an engineer. Anuradha prepares a job resignation meanwhile and gives it to Shyam, who in return tears it up because of her mentally ill mother and the poor conditions of her home. Later, he confronts Raju who reveals that he wants to see his mother happy.

Their life takes an unexpected turn when they get a call from Kabira which is a wrong number meant for the owner of Star Fisheries, Devi Prasad. The wrong number is because of the misprint in the phone directory, which renders Star Fisheries' number as Star Garage's and vice versa. Kabira, a terrorist and kidnapper, thinking that it is Devi Prasad, tells him that his granddaughter Rinku is kidnapped and asks for a ransom. Eavesdropping on the entire conversation going between Kabira and Shyam, Raju decides to play a game.

The game involves Shyam calling Devi Prasad posing as the kidnapper and asking for double the ransom amount, which will solve their monetary problems. Shyam and Babu Bhaiya initially repel the idea, but they finally give in when Raju convinces them that even though it's wrong, this is a golden chance to earn money and also to save a life. They call the real Deviprasad and ask for double ransom. On their first attempt they wear helmets as a disguise but their attempt gets foiled by the police led by Prakash (called secretly by Devi Prasad's servant). Kabira later informs them that the ransom has been doubled. They call Deviprasad again and ask for a foolproof double ransom.

On their second attempt, they wear Zorro costumes to hide their identities. However, they reveal themselves to Devi Prasad to win his confidence and try to save Rinku from the kidnappers. But she recognizes Shyam as an imposter and Kabira gets alerted. A huge fight involving the police, Kabira's gang members, and Khadak Singh & his men, infuriated by the delay in returning the money, takes place. Rinku is saved by the trio and returned to Devi Prasad. Babu Bhaiya and Shyam go home happily intending to find Raju with the money, but they find him missing. Assuming that he has cheated them, they call the police to confess the crime. But Raju returns and reveals that he had gone only to return the money of the creditors. The police arrive and, seeing the money, arrest the trio.

In the end, Devi Prasad comes to the trio's rescue and convinces the police that it was all a misunderstanding and saves the three and they go home, richer than ever. The film ends with the trio getting a prank call from Rinku.

Cast
Akshay Kumar as Rajesh Rathod ″Raju″
Suniel Shetty as Ghanshyam Tripathi "Shyam"
Paresh Rawal as Baburao Ganpatrao Apte ("Babu Bhaiya")
Tabu as Anuradha Shivshankar Panikar
Asrani as Bank Manager
Om Puri as Khadak Singh (Shyam's friend)
Kulbhushan Kharbanda as Devi Prasad
Gulshan Grover as Kabira
Razak Khan as Chhota Chetan, Kabira's close aide
Kashmira Shah as Kabira's gang member
Mukesh Khanna as Inspector Prakash (special appearance)
Sulabha Arya as Savitri Devi (Raju's mother)
Ann Alexia Anra as Rinku (Devi Prasad's granddaughter).
Dinesh Hingoo as Chaman Jhinga (a client of Star Fisheries)
Snehal Dabi as the Man misjudging Bank Manager at the Bus Stand as a pimp
Mushtaq Khan as Devi Prasad's servant
Sharad Sankla as Bank Peon
Bhairavi Vaidya as Mrs. Panikar, Anuradha's mother
Kahkashan Patel in a special appearance in song "Jab Bhi Koi Haseena" 
Rajeev Mehta as Laundry Business Owner, Raju's boss
Namrata Shirodkar as Miss Jhinga, Chaman's daughter & special appearance in the song "Tun Tunak Tun" (special appearance)

Production
Hera Pheri was the first time that Priyadarshan worked with Akshay Kumar and Sunil Shetty. He had worked with Paresh Rawal in Doli Saja Ke Rakhna. It also marked the beginning of a long association between Priyadarshan and the three actors.
Following Hera Pheri, Priyadarshan has made sure that either Kumar, Shetty, Rawal, or a combination of the three actors would star in his films. The only exceptions are Dhol, Billu, Tezz and Rangrezz.
Parts of the film were shot in Dubai and South Africa and Hera Pheri 3 will also be shot there.

Music

Score
The film score was composed by Surinder Sodhi.

Songs

Reception and legacy
The film did not open well upon release, but picked up later and became a box office success, grossing Rs. 24,25,00,000 in India. Much of the acclaim went to Akshay Kumar and Paresh Rawal for their comic timing and acting, Film is considered Kumar's foray into comedy genre and critics calling Rawal as "Baburao" is best performances ever. Aparajita Saha of Rediff stated "the movie belongs entirely to Paresh Rawal. Whatever laughter the film solicits is solely due to him. He has impeccable timing and a natural flair for comedy. Sunil Shetty's role and his performance is also too good." 

Alok Kumar of Planet Bollywood wrote, "All in all, Priyadarshan's Hera Pheri is a delight to watch for its performances, some songs, and an interesting story line. Indian audiences would be doing Bollywood injustice if they accept an inane film like Dulhan Hum Le Jayenge and reject a thrilling and entertaining Hera Pheri. Hopefully, the film will click with the masses, and the trailors and songs, if not the stars, will pull audiences to the theaters. Namrata Shirodkar's number has already caught on strong in India. Let's see if in a dull year of flicks like Mela, Krodh, and Bulandi a good film like Hera Pheri can make an impact.".

It has achieved a cult status among Indian audiences  and is regarded as one of the best Hindi comedy films ever made. The dialogues of the film became widely famous through out the years and are used popularly in Indian memes.

Awards and nominations

Sequel

Phir Hera Pheri, the sequel of this film, was released on 9 June 2006. Alongside the main trio, Bipasha Basu, Rimi Sen and Johny Lever joined the cast. The sequel was a box-office blockbuster.

Remakes

References

External links
 Hera Pheri Movie Meme Templates at Website
 
 
 

2000 films
Indian buddy films
2000s Hindi-language films
Hindi remakes of Malayalam films
2000s buddy films
Films directed by Priyadarshan
Films scored by Anu Malik
Indian comedy-drama films
2000s action comedy-drama films
Indian action comedy-drama films
Films about kidnapping in India
2000s comedy thriller films
Films scored by Surinder Sodhi